Scymnus horni is a species of dusky lady beetle in the family Coccinellidae. It is found in Central America, North America, and Oceania.

References

Further reading

 

Coccinellidae
Articles created by Qbugbot
Beetles described in 1897
Beetles of Central America
Beetles of North America
Beetles of Oceania